Bram Castro (born 30 September 1982) is a Belgian former footballer who plays as a goalkeeper.

Club career
Castro made his debut in professional football, being part of the RC Genk squad in the 2000–01 season. He also played for Sint-Truidense VV before joining Roda JC.

Roda JC
At Roda, Castro was the number one goalkeeper for 3 seasons. On 30 October 2007, Castro scored the equalizer (2–2) in the dying seconds of the KNVB Cup 2007-08 third round tie against De Graafschap. Roda JC won the match 3–2 after extra time and would go on to reach the final, losing to Feyenoord. In December 2009 Castro was involved in a fight with fellow teammember Anouar Hadouir, who hit Castro in the face. Hadouir was fined by the club but Castro would lose his place between the goalposts soon after and was released by Roda at the end of the season.

On 1 October 2010, Castro joined PSV Eindhoven for the 2010–11 season. After 1 season at PSV Eindhoven he played 1 season for Sint-Truidense VV, 2 seasons for MVV Maastricht and in the summer of the 2014/2015 season he signed a 2 year long deal with Dutch Eredivisie team Heracles Almelo.

Honours
Mechelen
 Belgian Cup: 2018–19

References

External links
 
 Voetbal International profile 
 

1982 births
Living people
Belgian footballers
Belgian people of Spanish descent
K.R.C. Genk players
Sint-Truidense V.V. players
Roda JC Kerkrade players
MVV Maastricht players
Heracles Almelo players
K.V. Mechelen players
K.V. Oostende players
Belgian Pro League players
Challenger Pro League players
Eredivisie players
Eerste Divisie players
Association football goalkeepers
Belgian expatriate sportspeople in the Netherlands
Belgian expatriate footballers
Expatriate footballers in the Netherlands
Sportspeople from Hasselt
Footballers from Limburg (Belgium)